is a Japanese singer-songwriter and musician.

She has frequently worked with Jim O'Rourke, with O'Rourke producing several of her albums and Ishibashi playing on his album Simple Songs. Together with Tatsuhisa Yamamoto they formed the band Kafka's Ibiki.

In 2016, she released the album Kouen Kyoudai, a collaboration with the Japanese noise musician Masami Akita (better known as Merzbow). She composed the music for the 2019 anime Blade of the Immortal. In 2021, she composed the music for the film Drive My Car, directed by Ryusuke Hamaguchi.

Personal Life
She is currently dating Jim O'Rourke.

Discography
 Works for Everything (2006 Rhythm Tracks)
 Lola and Soda (with Achico) (2007 Rhythm Tracks)
 Slip Beneath the Distant Tree (with Tatsuya Yoshida) (2007 Rhythm Tracks)
 Summer Dress (with Achico) (2008 Rhythm Tracks)
 Drifting Devil (2008 Rhythm Tracks)
 Carapace (2011 Felicity)
 Imitation of Life (2012 Felicity / Drag City)
 I'm Armed (2012 felicity)
 Car and Freezer (2014 Felicity / Drag City)
 Compressed Happiness (with K2) (2014 Phage Tapes)
  (with Masami Akita) (2016 Editions Mego)
 Ichida (with Darin Gray) (2018 Black Truffle)
 The Dream My Bones Dream (2018 Drag City)
 For McCoy (2021 Black Truffle)

References

External links

Year of birth missing (living people)
21st-century Japanese singers
21st-century Japanese women singers
Anime composers
Drag City (record label) artists
Japanese drummers
Japanese film score composers
Japanese keyboardists
Japanese singer-songwriters
Japanese women film score composers
Japanese women singer-songwriters
Living people
Musicians from Chiba Prefecture